The 8th ACTRA Awards were presented on April 4, 1979. The ceremony was hosted by Gordon Pinsent for television categories, and Don Harron for radio categories.

Television

Radio

Journalism and special awards

References

ACTRA
ACTRA
ACTRA Awards